The 1984 Tulane Green Wave football team was an American football team that represented Tulane University during the 1984 NCAA Division I-A football season as an independent. In their second year under head coach Wally English, the team compiled a 3–8 record.

Schedule

References

Tulane
Tulane Green Wave football seasons
Tulane Green Wave football